Ocean Avenue may refer to:

Roads in the United States
 Ocean Avenue (San Francisco), California, see Ocean Avenue/CCSF Pedestrian Bridge station
 Ocean Avenue (Santa Monica), California
 Ocean Avenue (Palm Beach), Florida; see 
 Ocean Avenue (Daytona Beach), Florida; see Daytona Beach Boardwalk
 Ocean Avenue (Brooklyn), New York
 Ocean Avenue (Asbury Park), New Jersey; see

Entertainment
 Ocean Avenue (album), a 2003 album by Yellowcard
 "Ocean Avenue" (song), the title track
 Ocean Ave., a 2002–2003 Swedish-American soap opera

See also
 
 Oceanic Avenue, Salvador, Bahia, Brazil